In statistics, the matrix variate Dirichlet distribution is a generalization of the matrix variate beta distribution and of the Dirichlet distribution.

Suppose  are  positive definite matrices with  also positive-definite, where  is the  identity matrix.  Then we say that the  have a matrix variate Dirichlet distribution, if their joint probability density function is

If we write  then the PDF takes the simpler form

on the understanding that .

Theorems

generalization of chi square-Dirichlet result

Suppose  are independently distributed Wishart  positive definite matrices.

Marginal distribution

If , and if , then:

Conditional distribution

where we write .

partitioned distribution

partitions

Suppose .  Define

Writing the Schur complement  we have

and

See also 

 Inverse Dirichlet distribution

References

A. K. Gupta and D. K. Nagar 1999. "Matrix variate distributions".  Chapman and Hall.

Probability distributions